Patriarch Theophilos III of Jerusalem (born 4 April 1952) is the current Patriarch of the Orthodox Church of Jerusalem. He is styled "Patriarch of the Holy City of Jerusalem and all Palestine and Israel." 

Theophilos (also spelled Theofilos or Theophilus) was elected unanimously on 22 August 2005 by the Holy Synod of Jerusalem as the 141st primate of the Orthodox Church of Jerusalem to succeed the deposed Irenaios. His election was confirmed by the Eastern Orthodox synod of Constantinople, and was endorsed by Jordan on 24 September 2005, and subsequently by the Palestinian National Authority, two of the governments ruling lands over his religious jurisdiction. He was enthroned on 22 November 2005, despite initial Israeli objection to the ousting of Irenaios. The Israeli government officially recognised Theophilos' election on 16 December 2007.

Prior to becoming Patriarch of Jerusalem, Theophilos was the Eastern Orthodox Archbishop of Tabor.

Biography

Theophilos was born Ilias Giannopoulos in Gargalianoi, Messenia, Greece on 4 April 1952 to parents Panagiotes and Triseugenia. In 1964, Ilias moved to Jerusalem.

He served as archdeacon for then-patriarch Benedict I of Jerusalem. From 1991 to 1996, he was a priest in Kafr Kanna in Galilee, which had a predominantly Israeli Arab Christian community, there he also formed a society called "Nour al Masih" ("Light of Christ"), to spread the Orthodox Christian faith throughout the region.

Theophilos studied theology at the University of Athens. He went on to complete an MA from Durham University, graduating in 1984 as a member of Castle. He has also studied at the Hebrew University of Jerusalem. Besides his native Greek, he also speaks English, Arabic and Hebrew.

In 1996, he was one of the first Christian clergymen in centuries to go work in the closed Wahhabi Islamic society of Qatar, where many Palestinian migrant workers live today, a considerable number of them Orthodox Christians. He subsequently served as Exarch of the Holy Sepulchre in Qatar.

From 2000 to 2003, he was church envoy to the Patriarchate of Moscow.

In February 2005, he was consecrated Archbishop of Tabor.

He was officially enthroned as Patriarch of Jerusalem and All Palestine on November 22, 2005. Delegates from all of the Orthodox Churches as well as high secular dignitaries were in attendance, including the President of Greece, and senior officials representing the governments of Palestinian National Authority, Jordan and Qatar, as well as diplomats and military officials.

Upon his election, Theophilos said: "In the last few months, we have had a lot of problems, but with the help of God we will overcome them."

See also
Arab Christians
Patriarch of Jerusalem
List of Durham University people

References

External links

 The Orthodox Patriarchate of Jerusalem
 OrthodoxWiki article
 Athens News profile

1952 births
21st-century Greek Orthodox Patriarchs of Jerusalem
Eastern Orthodox Christians from Greece
Greek expatriates in Israel
Living people
National and Kapodistrian University of Athens alumni
Alumni of University College, Durham
People from Gargalianoi
Recipients of the Order of Prince Yaroslav the Wise, 1st class